Vincent Wong may refer to:

 Vincent Wong (Hong Kong actor) (born 1983), Hong Kong actor
 Vincent Wong Wing Ki (born 1990), Hong Kong badminton player
 Vincent Wong (UK actor) (1928–2015), British-Chinese actor who appeared in four Bond films